Igor Wakhévitch (born 12 May 1948) is an avant-garde French composer. He released a series of studio albums in the 1970s and collaborated with Salvador Dalí in 1974. From the age of eight, Wakhévitch was taught the piano by French classical pianist Marguerite Long. He is the son of the art director Georges Wakhévitch.

Notes

External links
 
 [ Allmusic] entry for Igor Wakhevitch.

1948 births
Living people
20th-century classical composers
French classical composers
French male classical composers
French people of Ukrainian descent
Conservatoire de Paris alumni
20th-century French composers
20th-century French male musicians